Blackgum is an unincorporated community and census-designated place in Sequoyah County, Oklahoma, United States. Its population was 51 as of the 2010 census. Oklahoma State Highway 100 passes through the community.

Blackgum had a post office from June 17, 1895, until February 15, 1995. It was named for the blackgum tree.

Geography

Demographics

References

Unincorporated communities in Sequoyah County, Oklahoma
Unincorporated communities in Oklahoma
Census-designated places in Sequoyah County, Oklahoma
Census-designated places in Oklahoma